The women's 100 metres T13 event at the 2020 Summer Paralympics in Tokyo, took place on 31 August 2021.

Records
Prior to the competition, the existing records were as follows:

Results

Heats
Heat 1 took place on 31 August 2021, at 10:30:

Heat 2 took place on 31 August 2021, at 10:38:

Heat 3 took place on 31 August 2021, at 10:46:

Final
The final took place on 31 August 2021, at 20:10:

References

Women's 100 metres T13
2021 in women's athletics